Eating Out: The Open Weekend is a 2011 American sex comedy film and the fifth and final installment in the Eating Out film series. The film was directed by Q. Allan Brocka, who co-wrote it with Phillip J. Bartell. It was released on DVD in the United States on March 20, 2012.

Only Rebekah Kochan has appeared in all five films.

Plot
Zack (Chris Salvatore) and his new boyfriend Benji (Aaron Milo) are setting off to vacation at an all-male resort in Palm Springs, California, with their friend Lily (Harmony Santana). In light of the veritable smorgasbord of available men that are sure to be awaiting their arrival, Benji has proposed that he and Zack open up their relationship, just for the weekend. He is not ready to limit himself sexually and explains that this will be a good way for them to explore together. Zack is less than thrilled with the idea, but he's eager to keep Benji happy and, after all, he likes sex too. At the same time, Zack's ex, Casey (Daniel Skelton), is making his way to the same resort with his hag-in-training, Penny (Lilach Mendelovich). Knowing that Zack will be there with his new boyfriend, Casey immediately goes into panic mode, recruiting his new friend, Peter (Michael Vara), to be his pretend boyfriend for the weekend, proving to Zack that he has had no trouble moving on from their relationship. However, it is not long before all plans go awry, and Benji starts making eyes at Peter, while Zack realizes he might not be as over Casey as he'd thought. With the gay boys otherwise engaged, Lily and Penny are soon locked in combat for the attention of Luis, the resort's sexy bartender, who also happens to be the sole straight man in sight.

Cast
 Chris Salvatore as Zack Christopher
 Daniel Skelton as Casey
 Aaron Milo as Benji Aaron
 Lilach Mendelovich as Penny
 Harmony Santana as Lilly Veracruz
 Michael Vara as Peter
 Alvaro Orlando as Luis
 Jennifer Elise Cox as hotel clerk
 Ralph Cole Jr. as Jerry
 Mink Stole as Aunt Helen
 Rebekah Kochan as Tiffani von der Sloot
 Chris Puckett as Congressman Piel

References

External links
 
 

Eating Out (film series)
2011 films
2011 independent films
2011 LGBT-related films
2011 romantic comedy films
2010s sex comedy films
American independent films
American LGBT-related films
American romantic comedy films
American sequel films
American sex comedy films
2010s English-language films
Films about vacationing
Films set in Palm Springs, California
Films shot in California
Gay-related films
LGBT-related romantic comedy films
LGBT-related sex comedy films
Films set in hotels
Same-sex marriage in film
Films about trans women
Films about virginity
2010s American films